Logan County (standard abbreviation: LG) is a county located in the U.S. state of Kansas. As of the 2020 census, the county population was 2,762. The largest city and county seat is Oakley. The county was named for Gen. John A. Logan. The formation is mostly on private land. In 2016, The Nature Conservancy purchased the property and the Little Jerusalem Badlands State Park opened to the public in October, 2019.

History

Early history

For many millennia, the Great Plains of North America was inhabited by nomadic Native Americans.  From the 16th century to 18th century, the Kingdom of France claimed ownership of large parts of North America.  In 1762, after the French and Indian War, France secretly ceded New France to Spain, per the Treaty of Fontainebleau.

19th century
In 1802, Spain returned most of the land to France, but keeping title to about 7,500 square miles.  In 1803, most of the land for modern day Kansas was acquired by the United States from France as part of the 828,000 square mile Louisiana Purchase for 2.83 cents per acre.

In 1854, the Kansas Territory was organized, then in 1861 Kansas became the 34th U.S. state.  In 1887, Logan County was established.

Logan County was first created in 1871 as St. John County. St. John was formed from the area to the east of range 38 in what was then part of Wallace County. The Kansas State Legislature changed the name from St. John to Logan in 1885.

Geography

Major highways
 Kansas Highway 25
 U.S. Highway 40
 U.S. Highway 83
 Interstate 70

Adjacent counties
 Thomas County (north)
 Gove County (east)
 Scott County (southeast)
 Wichita County (south)
 Wallace County (west/Mountain Time border)
 Sherman County (northwest/Mountain Time border)

Demographics

At the 2000 census, there were 3,046 people, 1,243 households and 856 families residing in the county. The population density was 3 per square mile (1/km2). There were 1,423 housing units at an average density of 1 per square mile (1/km2). The racial makeup of the county was 96.72% White, 0.59% Black or African American, 0.16% Native American, 0.20% Asian, 0.72% from other races, and 1.61% from two or more races.  1.64% of the population were Hispanic or Latino of any race.

There were 1,243 households, of which 29.50% had children under the age of 18 living with them, 59.30% were married couples living together, 6.30% had a female householder with no husband present, and 31.10% were non-families. 28.60% of all households were made up of individuals, and 14.80% had someone living alone who was 65 years of age or older.  The average household size was 2.40 and the average family size was 2.98.

Age distribution was 25.40% under the age of 18, 7.20% from 18 to 24, 24.40% from 25 to 44, 22.30% from 45 to 64, and 20.70% who were 65 years of age or older. The median age was 41 years. For every 100 females there were 93.60 males. For every 100 females age 18 and over, there were 93.00 males.

The median household income was $32,131, and the median family income was $40,104. Males had a median income of $28,105 versus $19,609 for females. The per capita income for the county was $17,294.  About 4.70% of families and 7.30% of the population were below the poverty line, including 7.80% of those under age 18 and 8.60% of those age 65 or over.

Government

Presidential elections

Like all the High Plains, Logan County is overwhelmingly Republican. Only two Democrats have ever carried the county in a Presidential election: Woodrow Wilson in 1916 and Franklin D. Roosevelt in 1932. Since at least 1888 only three other Democrats have passed forty percent of the county's vote: Roosevelt in 1936, Lyndon Johnson in 1964 and Jimmy Carter in 1976. In fact, apart from Michael Dukakis in 1988 during an election held during the grip of a major Plains drought, no Democrat since 1980 has passed 21 percent of the county's vote.

Laws
Following amendment to the Kansas Constitution in 1986, the county remained a prohibition, or "dry", county until 2006, when voters approved the sale of alcoholic liquor by the individual drink without a food sales requirement.

Education

Unified school districts
 Oakley USD 274
 Triplains USD 275

Communities

Cities
 Oakley (part)
 Russell Springs
 Winona

Unincorporated communities
† means a Census-Designated Place (CDP) by the United States Census Bureau.
 Monument†
 Page City

Ghost towns
 McAllaster
 Sheridan

Townships
Logan County is divided into eleven townships. None of the cities within the county is considered governmentally independent, and all figures for the townships include those of the cities.

In the following table, the population center is the largest city (or cities) included in that township's population total, if it is of a significant size.

See also
 Dry counties

References

Notes

Further reading

External links

County
 
 Logan County - Directory of Public Officials
Maps
 Logan County Maps: Current, Historic, KDOT
 Kansas Highway Maps: Current, Historic, KDOT
 Kansas Railroad Maps: Current, 1996, 1915, KDOT and Kansas Historical Society

 
Kansas counties
1887 establishments in Kansas
Populated places established in 1887